Bar Qaleh or Barqaleh may refer to:
 Bar Qaleh, Divandarreh
 Bar Qaleh, Marivan